Vila Verde is a town and a municipality in northern Portugal. It may also refer to the following places in Portugal:

 Vila Verde (Vila Verde), a civil parish in the municipality of Vila Verde
 Vila Verde (Alijó), a civil parish in the municipality of Alijó
 Vila Verde (Felgueiras), a civil parish in the municipality of Felgueiras
 Vila Verde (Figueira da Foz), a civil parish in the municipality of Figueira da Foz
 Vila Verde (Mirandela), a civil parish in the municipality of Mirandela
 Vila Verde (Vinhais), a civil parish in the municipality of Vinhais
 Vila Verde da Raia, a civil parish in the municipality of Chaves
 Vila Verde de Ficalho, a civil parish in the municipality of Serpa
 Vila Verde dos Francos, a civil parish in the municipality of Alenquer